This is a list of episodes for the first season of the 1970s television series, Charlie's Angels. Broadcast on the ABC network from September 22, 1976, to May 4, 1977 - with a total of 22 episodes - season one starred Kate Jackson, Farrah Fawcett-Majors, Jaclyn Smith and David Doyle. John Forsythe provided the voice of the character Charles "Charlie" Townsend.

The pilot film aired on March 21, 1976, as a 2-hour TV movie. Succeeding episodes were between 48 and 50 minutes in length. Viewing figures for the first season were extremely high, finishing at #5 in the Nielsen ratings.

The pilot episode featured M*A*S*H actor David Ogden Stiers as the character Scott Woodville, a male liaison to Charlie. Woodville was dropped for the series as it was felt the character was too severe and that it was unnecessary for Charlie to have two male liaisons. Fellow liaison Bosley (played by Doyle) was kept as someone the writers could use to add humor to the episodes.

The show's three female leads were launched to greater heights in their careers, with Fawcett-Majors proving to be the most popular of the trio. Although Jackson and Smith were overshadowed by Fawcett-Majors they have equally stood the test of time; both have also been cited as "fan favorites".

Note that the United States Copyright Office starts numbering the episodes with "Hellride", the first regular episode of season 1.

Main cast

Kate Jackson as Sabrina Duncan (regular)
Farrah Fawcett-Majors as Jill Munroe (regular)
Jaclyn Smith as Kelly Garrett (regular)
David Doyle as John Bosley (regular)
John Forsythe as Charles "Charlie" Townsend (regular, voice only)
David Ogden Stiers as Scott Woodville (pilot episode only)

Notable guest stars
Fernando Lamas 
Ida Lupino 
Dick Sargent 
Richard Mulligan 
Frank Gorshin 
Michael Bell 
Bo Hopkins 
Jenny O'Hara 
Anthony James 
Tom Selleck 
Tommy Lee Jones 
Kim Basinger 
Lauren Tewes
Dirk Benedict

Episodes

References

01
1976 American television seasons
1977 American television seasons